Caul may refer to:
 Caul, a thin, filmy membrane that covers or partly covers a newborn mammal immediately after birth
 Caul (headgear), a historical headdress worn by women that covers tied-up hair
 Caul fat, the membrane around food animals' internal organs
 A curved batten, usually used in pairs for applying even pressure across wide workpieces
 In woodworking, a strip or block of wood used to distribute or direct clamping force
 Term for greater omentum in animals